Kim Myung-Hwan  (born 6 March 1987) is a South Korean football defender.

He related match-fixing scandal and his football career was rescinded.

References

External links 

1987 births
Living people
South Korean footballers
Association football defenders
Jeju United FC players